The Kharan Rifles is a paramilitary regiment forming part of the Pakistani Frontier Corps Balochistan (South). It is responsible for border security, counter-insurgency, and maintaining law and order in southwest Pakistan. It guards the border area at the junction of Pakistan, Iran and Afghanistan, a major transit area for trade and traffic. Administratively the regiment comes under the Interior Ministry, while it is commanded by seconded officers of the Pakistan Army.

History
In 1978, the Balochistan Constabulary, a paramilitary unit based in the Khuzdar and Kharan Districts in Balochistan Province, was deactivated, raised anew as a unit of the Frontier Corps and joined by the 84th Wing of the Chagai Militia. The new name of the unit was the Kharan Rifles and their base was moved from the large city of Khuzdar to the remote settlement of Nok Kundi. The Rifles were subdivided into three battalions: the 75th Wing, the 76th Wing, and the 84th Wing. By 1985 the Rifles had a strength of 2,200 personnel, but it remained a lightly-armed unit.

In 1988, personnel of the Rifles discovered and neutralised several explosive devices on the main highway linking the Iranian city of Zahedan and Pakistani city of Quetta. In September 1999, one person died and three were injured in a confrontation with armed personnel based in Taftan, Balochistan.

In the early 21st century, the Rifles apprehended significant amounts of smuggled weapons and ammunition near the Pakistan-Afghanistan border in Chagai District including on 11 July 2002, and 16 March 2006.

The Rifles have also been in anti-drugs operations. In June 2002, the unit intercepted smugglers and seized two tonnes of heroin, with an estimated street value of $13 million. In 2011-2012, the unit received a number of drug testing kits to assist in their work against drug smuggling.

Units
 Headquarters Wing
 60 Wing
 75 Wing
 76 Wing
 84 Wing
 145 Wing

References

Regiments of the Frontier Corps
Kharan District
1978 establishments in Pakistan
Frontier Corps Balochistan (South)